The 2012 Faroe Islands Cup was the 58th edition of the Faroe Islands domestic football cup. It started on 24 March 2012 and ended with the final on 25 August 2012. EB/Streymur were the defending champions, having won their fourth cup title the previous year. The winner of the competition qualified for the first qualifying round of the 2013–14 UEFA Europa League.

Only the first teams of Faroese football clubs were allowed to participate. The preliminary round involved only teams from 1. deild, 2. deild and 3. deild competitions. Teams from the highest division entered the competition in the first round.

Preliminary round
Three clubs from the 2. deild and one club from the 3. deild entered this round. The matches took place on 24 March 2012. The draw for this round of the competition was made on 13 February 2012.

|}

First round
The two winners from the preliminary round, all ten clubs from the Faroe Islands Premier League and four clubs from the 1. deild entered this round. These matches took place on 9 April 2012. The draw for this round of the competition was made on 13 February 2012.

|}

Quarterfinals
The matches took place on 25 April 2012.

|}

Semifinals
The ties were played over two legs on 9 May and 23 May 2012.

|}

Final

Top goalscorers

References

External links
 Official site 
 soccerandequipment.com

Faroe Islands Cup seasons
Cup
Faroe Islands Cup